Berkenbrück station is a railway station in the municipality of Berkenbrück, located in the amt Odervorland in the Oder-Spree district, Brandenburg, Germany.

References

Railway stations in Brandenburg
Buildings and structures in Oder-Spree